Dead End is a 2003 English-language French horror film written and directed by Jean-Baptiste Andrea and Fabrice Canepa, and starring Alexandra Holden, Ray Wise, Lin Shaye, Mick Cain, Billy Asher, and Amber Smith. It tells the story of a dysfunctional family who find themselves on a never-ending road in the middle of a forest during a routine drive on Christmas Eve, while under pursuit of a mysterious hearse and a woman dressed in white.

Plot

Driving on Christmas Eve with his family, Frank Harrington decides to take a short cut through a remote location. In the car with him: his wife Laura, his son, Richard, his daughter, Marion, and her boyfriend, Brad. It is night, and as Frank drives, he begins to fall asleep at the wheel, only to be woken by the screams of his family, warning him of an oncoming vehicle. He narrowly avoids the vehicle, and after an inspection of his car, continues to drive. Confused, Laura questions her husband as to why he didn't take the usual route to her mother-in-law's house; he claims he was "bored" and fancied a change.

As the siblings bicker, Frank abruptly stops the car, claiming he saw a young woman dressed in white in the forest. The woman appears at Frank's window, holding a baby. Marion, seeing how distressed the woman appears to be, and realizing that she needs help, offers to walk so that they can take the woman in the car to a house for help. The woman gets into the car, and as the family ask her questions, she remains silent. They arrive at a wooden cabin, and Laura and Frank go in to investigate. Meanwhile, Richard goes to masturbate in the woods, leaving Brad in the car with the woman and her child. Brad begins questioning the woman and telling the woman his plans to propose to Marion, meanwhile Marion walks along the road to catch up with the family and rehearses how she plans to break up with Brad. The woman tells Brad the name of her child; Amy, and passes her to him. A confused Brad asks how the child can breathe with the blankets covering her face, the woman replies that the baby is dead. Confused, Brad lifts the blankets to discover what appears to be the corpse of the child, and screams. The camera changes back to Richard, who hears the scream and immediately runs back to the car. Brad and the woman are nowhere to be seen. However, Marion sees a hearse driving down the road, and as she turns to look, she sees Brad screaming for help in the back of it. She runs back to the family and makes them drive after the hearse.

Frank once again stops the car after they hit something in the road. He finds Brad's mutilated body, and as Marion goes into a state of shock, Laura attempts to call the police using Brad's cellphone. However, the other end of the line is a woman begging for help. Disturbed by this, Laura doesn't tell the rest of the family. As they begin driving again, Marion sits silently. As tension rises, Laura questions Frank's ability to direct them. They argue, and he tells Laura that he hates visiting her family. Frank abruptly stops the car once again when he sees a baby carriage in the road. Richard gets out to look and pretends to be pulled into the carriage, scaring his parents. They get back into the car, only to stop again. This time Richard gets picked up by the same hearse as before. While the three run to save Richard, Frank sees the "woman in white" again. They find Richard's body and Laura begins to show signs of insanity.

Driving with his daughter in the front of the car, Marion appears to have returned to normal, and the family pass a sign that says "Marcott". Frank realizes that this must be a military road, and that's why it's not on the map. During another stop, Laura shoots Frank in the leg with a shotgun that they unwrapped, which was a present for a family member. After dressing the wound, they begin the drive again. Shortly after, Laura talks about seeing the face of a friend who had died 20 years earlier in the woods. She demands to visit with her departed friend, and upon Frank refusing, jumps out of the moving vehicle. Frank stops and they search for Laura until the hearse appears once again. Frank tries to shoot the driver but the car begins backing up as Laura appears. She is disheveled and begins babbling with her brain exposed from the back of her head, revealing Frank had accidentally shot her instead. Laura collapses and dies. Putting her in the back of the car, Frank and Marion continue driving. They come across the same ranger station they had stopped at earlier, and Frank is attacked in the dark by the lady in white. Afterward, Frank has a noticeable change in demeanor, much like his wife and daughter, and punches Marion unconscious. He sees the woman in white go into the woods once again, and chases her with the shotgun. He begins screaming and shooting the gun, only to be quickly dispatched in the dark. Marion awakens and starts the car. She begins to drive when the car suddenly runs out of gas. She begins to walk and sees body bags containing her dead family members in the middle of the road. As she cries the hearse pulls up, but the woman in white appears behind her. She tells a frightened Marion that the hearse isn't there for her before getting into the hearse and driving off, leaving Marion alone with her dead family.

Marion suddenly awakens in the hospital, heavily bandaged. The doctor tells her of her coma and assures Marion that she and the baby will be fine. On the way out of the hospital, the doctor talks to a man claiming to be the one that found the family after the car crash. The car is then seen being pulled from a wreck, and the doctor discusses the accident. The man confirms that the whole family, except Marion, have died, and that the crash has also claimed the life of a young woman and her baby in the other car. He asks the doctor for her name, and she reveals to him that it is Dr. Marcott. The viewer gets the impression that Marion dreamed of how her family had died while in a coma, and that the hearse not picking her up was her dream telling her that she would live. As the doctor tries to leave, her car fails to start, and the man who found the family offers her a lift in the same hearse from Marion's dream.

As the credits roll, two workers are seen sweeping up debris from the crash. They find a note Frank had previously written in the car with Marion before their final stop, insinuating that the experiences of the family were real.

Cast

Production
The film was shot in Los Angeles County, California in 2002.

Release
After its premiere at the Festival international du film fantastique de Gérardmer in January 2003, the film received a theatrical release in the United Kingdom on 12 December 2003.

Critical response

On Rotten Tomatoes the film has an approval rating of 75% based on 8 reviews, with an average rating of 6.14/10.

Peter Bradshaw of The Guardian praised the film as "macabre and supernatural in the approved manner, not stunningly original, but with some ingenious twists and humorous performances." Neil Smith of BBC gave the film three out of five stars, writing "Dead End— feels like an extended episode of The Twilight Zone, but it's witty and chilling enough to offer some spine-tingling surprises en route." Varietys Derek Elley wrote: "With most of the gore off-screen, and almost the entire film set within the family car or on the country road, Andrea & Canepa manage to sustain interest largely through dialogue, pitched at a satisfyingly pulpy level and played with straight-faced glee by the small cast."

John Noonan of HorrorNews.net gave the film a positive review, writing, "A potent mix of nasty and fun, Dead End is the perfect film to put on at family gatherings to get them all out of your house." Arrow in the Head rated the film a score of 7 out of 10, commending the film's atmosphere, performances, humor, and tension, while criticizing the soundtrack as being "a mixed bag". Johnny Butane from Dread Central gave the film a score of 3.5 out of 5, praising the film's performances, plot, and blend of thrills and humor, while noting the film's weak ending.

Accolades

 2004 – Fantasporto – International Fantasy Film Award – Nominee Only
 2004 – Peñíscola Comedy Film Festival – Best Actress (Lin Shaye) – Winner
 2004 – Peñíscola Comedy Film Festival – Best First Work – Winner
 2003 – Brussels International Festival of Fantasy Film – Grand Prize of European Fantasy Film in Silver – Winner
 2003 – Brussels International Festival of Fantasy Film – Pegasus Audience Award – Winner
 2003 – Cinénygma - Luxembourg International Film Festival – Grand Prize of European Fantasy Film in Gold – Nominated only
 2003 – Doaui First Film Festival – Youth Jury Award – Winner
 2003 – Fant-Asia Film Festival – Jury Prize – Winner
 2003 – San Sebastián Horror and Fantasy Film Festival – Audience Award – Winner

References

External links
 
 

2003 films
2003 horror films
French Christmas horror films
French horror films
French road movies
French supernatural horror films
Films set in forests
Films set in the United States
Films shot in Los Angeles County, California
English-language French films
2000s Christmas horror films
2000s English-language films
2000s French films
2000s road movies